Nahal Issaron ( Naẖal Issaron) is a wadi and neolithic settlement in southern Negev, Israel. Excavations carried out by Avi Gopher and Nigel Goring-Morris in Nahal Issaron in 1980 uncovered remnants of an early pastoralist settlement belonging to the Pre-Pottery Neolithic B period.

References

1980 archaeological discoveries
Prehistoric sites in Israel
Archaeological sites in Israel
Neolithic settlements
7th-millennium BC establishments
Populated places established in the 7th millennium BC
Wadis of Israel
Pre-Pottery Neolithic B
Negev